Oakley is a city in Contra Costa County, California, United States. It is within the nine-county San Francisco Bay Area. The population at the 2020 United States census was 43,357. Oakley was incorporated in 1999, making it the newest incorporated city in Contra Costa County.

Etymology
The name "oak" comes from the abundance of oak trees, while the suffix "-ley" comes from the Old English word for "field" or "meadow".
The name Oakley is of Old English origin and its meaning is "meadow of oak trees". This aptly describes the area when first settled and to some extent even today. However, if not for the flip of a coin and cribbage board the community may have been named Dewey. City founder Randolph Marsh wanted to name the city Dewey, after Admiral Dewey, in honor of Dewey's success at Battle of Manila Bay during the Spanish–American War. His friend J.T. Whightman preferred the name "Oakley" because the terrain was largely meadows and oaks. To determine which name would prevail they battled it out over a game of cribbage. Marsh may have lost the game and the right to name the city but he ensured his immortality by choosing downtown street names whose first initials spelled "Marsh" — Main, Acme, Ruby, Star and Home.

History

Indigenous history

Archeologists have found prehistoric sites in the Oakley area. One substantial shell mound was discovered early in the 20th century near what is now the eastern edge of town. The Northwest Information Center of the California Historical Resources Information System monitors the archeological investigations undertaken in Oakley. Around three dozen such projects have been completed in the past 25 years, yielding only four prehistoric sites in the city. However, the information center believes there is a high possibility that other prehistoric sites remain within the city. To enable further archaeological excavation, the site referred to as Simon Mound was purchased by the Archaeological Conservancy after many of the ancient settlement places had already been destroyed by urban encroachment. Simone Mound has provided bones and fragments from burial sites starting around 1000 A.D. and is near a similar Conservancy preserve, the Hotchkiss Mound.

The first accounts of identifiable cultural community in the west delta are attributed to the Bay Miwoks, who occupied the region between 1100 and 1770 AD. The Bay Miwok people, usually called the Julpunes or Pulpunes by European explorers, were organized into "tribelets"—political units that included several fairly permanent villages and a set of seasonal campsites arrayed across a well-defined territory.

Spanish exploration
Incursions of the Spanish Empire into the Oakley area began in the 1770s. The first group to enter the present-day city limits was the De Anza expedition of 1775–76. However, after a failed attempt to find a route through the tule swamps to the Sierra, the De Anza expedition returned to Monterey. Subsequent expeditions by the Spanish did not result in colonization. Europeans settled in the Delta in the 19th century, but were killed by malaria and smallpox.

American period
Oakley's first post office was established in 1898.

Oakley became an incorporated city in 1999.

Geography and environment
Oakley experiences 52% clear days throughout the year.

Oakley's western border is California State Route 160. The City of Antioch adjoins Oakley on the west, the city of Brentwood adjoins Oakley on the south, and Bethel Island lies to the east. The Sacramento-San Joaquin Delta forms the northern boundary.  The southwestern skyline is dominated by Mt. Diablo.

Government
The City of Oakley is a general-law city, as opposed to a charter city, formed under state legislative statutes and governed by a body of laws in the state Constitution. Oakley operates under a council-manager form of government. 

The Oakley City Council consists of five non-partisan council members elected "at large". Oakley's city council members are considered part-time because, aside from being council members, they have full-time jobs. This part-time nature of the council opens up opportunities for ordinary citizens who are working in the private sector to participate.

At the first council meeting in December, the mayor is selected by a majority of the city council from among currently serving council members. At this time a vice mayor is also selected.

Politics
In 2017, Oakley had 19,906 registered voters with 9,921 (49.8%) registered as Democrats, 4,705 (23.6%) registered as Republicans, and 4,371 (22%) decline to state voters. Records show that 662 Oakley voters are registered Independents, with an additional 55 registered Green Party members.

Agriculture

Oakley has had vineyards since the late 1800s. Early Portuguese and Italian immigrants found the climate amenable and planted thousands of acres of vineyards.

Oakley's grape harvest can conservatively be estimated at about 2,000 tons. These grapes are distributed to a number of local wineries.

Transportation

Oakley is part of the East Contra Costa Bicycle Plan, which has existing facilities in Oakley as well as plans for further expansion.

Fire services

The East Contra Costa Fire Protection District (ECCFPD) was formed in 2002 when the Contra Costa County Board of Supervisors consolidated the East Diablo Fire District, Oakley-Knightsen Fire District and Bethel Island Fire District. ECCFPD serves the cities of Brentwood and Oakley, as well as the unincorporated areas of Bethel Island, Byron, Discovery Bay, Knightsen, and Marsh Creek-Morgan Territory.

After lengthy negotiations between the County and the cities of Oakley and Brentwood governance of the ECCFPD was turned over to a new governing board in February 2010.

Demographics

2010
The 2010 United States Census reported that Oakley had a population of 35,432. The racial makeup of Oakley was 22,641 (63.9%) White, 2,582 (7.3%) African American, 314 (0.9%) Native American, 2,236 (6.3%) Asian, 142 (0.4%) Pacific Islander, 4,998 (14.1%) from other races, and 2,519 (7.1%) from two or more races. There were 12,364 people (34.9%) of Hispanic or Latino ancestry, of any race.

The Census reported that 35,329 people (99.7% of the population) lived in households, 75 (0.2%) lived in non-institutionalized group quarters, and 28 (0.1%) were institutionalized.

There were 10,727 households, out of which 5,479 (51.1%) had children under the age of 18 living in them, 6,531 (60.9%) were opposite-sex married couples living together, 1,412 (13.2%) had a female householder with no husband present, 708 (6.6%) had a male householder with no wife present.  There were 747 (7.0%) unmarried opposite-sex partnerships, and 93 (0.9%) same-sex married couples or partnerships. 1,522 households (14.2%) were made up of individuals, and 515 (4.8%) had someone living alone who was 65 years of age or older. The average household size was 3.29.  There were 8,651 families (80.6% of all households); the average family size was 3.62.

The population was spread out, with 10,808 people (30.5%) under the age of 18, 3,531 people (10.0%) aged 18 to 24, 10,149 people (28.6%) aged 25 to 44, 8,553 people (24.1%) aged 45 to 64, and 2,391 people (6.7%) who were 65 years of age or older.  The median age was 32.0 years. For every 100 females, there were 98.8 males.  For every 100 females age 18 and over, there were 96.9 males.

The homeowner vacancy rate was 3.4%; the rental vacancy rate was 5.5%.  26,778 people (75.6% of the population) lived in owner-occupied housing units and 8,551 people (24.1%) lived in rental housing units.

1999
As of the census of 2000, there were 25,619 people, 7,832 households, and 6,461 families residing in the city.  The population density was 796.4/km2 (2,063.2/mi2).  There were 7,946 housing units at an average density of 247.0/km2 (639.9/mi2).  The racial makeup of the city was 75.50% White, 3.42% Black or African American, 0.89% Native American, 2.86% Asian, 0.29% Pacific Islander, 10.58% from other races, and 6.46% from two or more races.  24.98% of the population were Hispanic or Latino of any race.

There were 7,832 households, out of which 52.0% had children under the age of 18 living with them, 68.2% were married couples living together, 9.1% had a female householder with no husband present, and 17.5% were non-families. 13.0% of all households were made up of individuals, and 4.1% had someone living alone who was 65 years of age or older.  The average household size was 3.26 and the average family size was 3.56.

In the city, the population was spread out, with 34.5% under the age of 18, 7.6% from 18 to 24, 34.5% from 25 to 44, 18.0% from 45 to 64, and 5.4% who were 65 years of age or older.  The median age was 32 years.  For every 100 females, there were 102.1 males.  For every 100 females age 18 and over, there were 100.4 males.

The median income for a household in the city was $65,589, and the median income for a family was $68,888. Males had a median income of $49,883 versus $34,659 for females. The per capita income for the city was $21,895.  5.0% of the population and 2.8% of families were below the poverty line.  Out of the total population, 4.7% of those under the age of 18 and 7.4% of those 65 and older were living below the poverty line.

Education
The city is mainly served by the Oakley Union Elementary School District (K–8) and the Liberty Union High School District.

Elementary schools
Oakley Elementary School
Gehringer Elementary School
Laurel Elementary School
Vintage Parkway Elementary School
Iron House Elementary School
Orchard Park School (K–8, located in the Antioch Unified School District)
Almond Grove Elementary School
Summer Lake Elementary School (starting the 2019–20 academic year)

Middle schools
O'Hara Park Middle School
Delta Vista Middle School
Orchard Park School (K–8, located in the Antioch Unified School District)

High schools
Freedom High School

Public libraries
The Oakley branch of the Contra Costa County Library system is located in Oakley.

Notable people

 Joe Mixon, running back for the Cincinnati Bengals, 2017–present
 Tia Barrett, a 2023 second-team NAIA All-America selection for Xavier University of Louisiana in competitive cheer
 Nguyen Do, poet, editor, and translator, relocated from San Francisco to Oakley.
 Lisa Joann Thompson, dancer, actress, choreographer, starred in In Living Color, Fame L.A. and Motown Live, lived in Oakley during her high school years.

References

External links

Local News (Eastcountytoday.net)
Oakley Local News (Oakley Press)
(Oakley Events EastCountyLive.com SPOTLIGHT)

Cities in Contra Costa County, California
Cities in the San Francisco Bay Area
Incorporated cities and towns in California
Sacramento–San Joaquin River Delta